Aeromicrobium panaciterrae is a Gram-positive, strictly aerobic, rod-shaped, and non-spore-forming bacterium from the genus Aeromicrobium which has been isolated from soil from a ginseng field in Pocheon, Korea.

References 

Propionibacteriales
Bacteria described in 2007